George Herbert Adams (May 18, 1851 – November 18, 1911) was an American Republican politician and lawyer who served as the President of the New Hampshire Senate.

Adams was born in Campton, New Hampshire, May 18, 1851, the only child of Isaac L. and Louisa C. (Blair) Adams.

After he graduated from Dartmouth College in 1873, Adams spent a year as the principal of the high school of Marlborough, Massachusetts.  In January 1874, Adams entered the law office of Henry W. Blair in Plymouth, New Hampshire to study the law.  Adams studied law until he was admitted to the Bar, during the September 1876 term of the New Hampshire Supreme Court at Grafton County, New Hampshire.

On January 14, 1877, Adams married Sarah Katherine Smith of Meredith, New Hampshire.  They had two children, Walter Blair Adams born December 13, 1887, and George Herbert Adams, Jr., born April 12, 1890.

Adams was a delegate from Campton at the 1876 New Hampshire Constitutional Convention, and he was to elected to represent Plymouth in the New Hampshire House of Representatives in 1883, and to the New Hampshire Senate in 1889 and 1905, and in 1905 he was chosen the President of the New Hampshire Senate.  Adams was twice elected the Solicitor of Grafton County, New Hampshire, serving for four years starting April 1, 1895.

Adams died in Plymouth, New Hampshire November 18, 1911, and is buried in Trinity Cemetery, Holderness, New Hampshire.

Notes

External links
 Publications - Portraits of Legislators On State House Third Floor George H. Adams

1851 births
1911 deaths
New Hampshire lawyers
American railway entrepreneurs
Republican Party members of the New Hampshire House of Representatives
Republican Party New Hampshire state senators
Presidents of the New Hampshire Senate
Dartmouth College alumni
19th-century American politicians
People from Campton, New Hampshire
19th-century American lawyers
19th-century American businesspeople